Domonique Dorian Dolton (born November 20, 1989) is an American professional boxer. Came into the world of boxing as his uncle Cornelius Grimes took him into Kronk Gym on the west side of Detroit, after multiple altercations in school.

Amateur career
Dolton lost to Keith Thurman at the 2008 Olympic Trials and missed out on the Olympic games.

Sparring partners
He was the chief sparring partner of Miguel Cotto, for Cotto's fight with Yuri Foreman at Yankee Stadium in New York City.

Professional  career
On April 4, 2008, Dolton won his pro debut by knocking out veteran Derick Minton in second round. Dolton is the current US NABA & WBC FECARBOX Middleweight Champion via split decision win over Donatas Bondoravas.

Professional record

|- style="margin:0.5em auto; font-size:95%;"
| style="text-align:center;" colspan="8"|14 Wins (8 knockouts), 0 Losses, 0 Draw
|-  style="text-align:center; margin:0.5em auto; font-size:95%; background:#e3e3e3;"
|  style="border-style:none none solid solid; "|Res.
|  style="border-style:none none solid solid; "|Record
|  style="border-style:none none solid solid; "|Opponent
|  style="border-style:none none solid solid; "|Type
|  style="border-style:none none solid solid; "|Rd., Time
|  style="border-style:none none solid solid; "|Date
|  style="border-style:none none solid solid; "|Location
|  style="border-style:none none solid solid; "|Notes
|- align=center
|style="background:#abcdef;"|Draw || 13-0-0 ||align=left| Oscar Molina
|MD || 10 (10) || September 29, 2015 ||align=left| Palms Casino and Resort, Pearl Theater, Las Vegas, Nevada
|align=left|
|- align=center
|Win || 9-5-1 ||align=left| Victor Fonsecas
|RTD || 5 (8) || June 12, 2015 ||align=left| UIC Pavilion, Chicago, Illinois
|align=left|
|- align=center
|Win || 6-9-1 ||align=left| Juan Carlos Rojas
|UD || 6 (6) || February 6, 2015 ||align=left| Beau Rivage Resort & Casino, Biloxi, Mississippi
|align=left|
|- align=center
|Win || 14-4-0 ||align=left| Jonathan Batista
|UD || 6 (6) || November 14, 2014 ||align=left| CONSOL Energy Center, Pittsburgh, Pennsylvania
|align=left|
|- align=center
|Win || 12-8-0 ||align=left| Basilio Silva
|TKO || 5 (10) || May 24, 2013 ||align=left| Club Maquiteria, Santo Domingo, Dominican Republic
|align=left|
|- align=center
|Win || 13-0-0 ||align=left| Richard Gutierrez 
|UD || 10 (10) || November 30, 2012 ||align=left| BB&T Center, Sunrise, Florida
|align=left|vacant WBA Fedelatin light middleweight title
|- align=center
|Win || 26-10-1 ||align=left| Jose Soto
|TKO || 4 (10) || October 12, 2012 ||align=left| Club el Millon, Santo Domingo, Dominican Republic
|align=left|
|- align=center
|Win || 12-2-1 ||align=left| Donatas Bondoravas
|MD || 10 (10) || June 4, 2011 ||align=left| Seminole Hard Rock, Hollywood, Florida
|align=left|vacant WBC FECARBOX middleweight title and vacant NABA USA middleweight title
|- align=center
|Win || 20-22-2 ||align=left| Marcos Primera
|UD || 8 (8) || January 22, 2011 ||align=left| The Greenbrier, White Sulphur Springs, West Virginia
|align=left|
|- align=center
|Win || 3-29-2 ||align=left| Guy Packer
|TKO || 2 (1:55) || November 12, 2010 ||align=left| Royal Oak Theatre, Royal Oak, Michigan
|align=left|
|- align=center
|Win || 7-3-0 ||align=left| Norbert Szekeres
|KO || 3 (1:17) || September 11, 2010 ||align=left|Frankfurt, Hessen, Germany
|align=left|
|- align=center
|Win || 1-4-10 ||align=left| Jeremiah Jones
|TKO || 2 (1:55) || July 23, 2010 ||align=left| Royal Oak Theatre, Royal Oak, Michigan
|align=left|
|- align=center
|Win || 11-10-2 ||align=left| Omar Siala 
|TKO || 3(0:12) || March 20, 2010 ||align=left| Esprit Arena, Düsseldorf, Germany
|align=left|
|- align=center
|Win || 5-11-3 ||align=left| Richard Best
|UD || 4(4) || August 29, 2009 ||align=left| QuikTrip Park, Grand Prairie, Texas
|align=left|
|- align=center
|Win || 7-6-1 ||align=left| Robert Jones
|UD || 8(8) || May 1, 2009 ||align=left| DeCarlo Center, Warren, Michigan
|align=left|
|- align=center
|Win || debut ||align=left| William Thomas
|UD || 4(4) || October 10, 2008 ||align=left| DeCarlo Center, Warren, Michigan
|align=left|
|- align=center
|Win || debut ||align=left| Deangelo Foster
|TKO || 1(2:13) || August 30, 2008 ||align=left| Cincinnati Gardens, Cincinnati, Ohio
|align=left|
|- align=center
|Win || 0-1-0 ||align=left| Derick Minton
|TKO || 2(2:30) || April 4, 2008 ||align=left| Bert's Theatre, Detroit, Michigan
|align=left|
|- align=center

References

External links

1989 births
Living people
African-American boxers
American male boxers
Boxers from Detroit
Light-middleweight boxers
21st-century African-American sportspeople
20th-century African-American people